Tinker Bell is a 2008 American computer animated film and the first installment in the Disney Fairies franchise produced by DisneyToon Studios. It is about Tinker Bell, a fairy character created by J. M. Barrie in his 1904 play Peter Pan, or The Boy Who Wouldn't Grow Up, and featured in the 1953 Disney animated film, Peter Pan and its 2002 sequel Return to Neverland. Unlike Disney's two Peter Pan films featuring the character, which were produced primarily using traditional animation, Tinker Bell was produced using digital 3D modeling. The film was released on DVD and Blu-ray by Walt Disney Studios Home Entertainment on October 28, 2008. A sequel, Tinker Bell and the Lost Treasure, was released in 2009.

Tinker Bell is the first Disney film to feature Tinker Bell in a speaking role. Actress Brittany Murphy was originally selected for the part before the role went to Mae Whitman. The film follows Tinker Bell’s origin story, before she met Peter Pan, as she works out her place in Pixie Hollow and struggles with what her “talent” is.

Plot
Tinker Bell (Mae Whitman) is born from the first laugh of a baby and is brought by the winds to Pixie Hollow (which is part of the island of Neverland), and Queen Clarion (Anjelica Huston) welcomes her. She learns that her talent is to be one of the tinkers, the fairies who make and fix things. Two other tinker fairies, Bobble (Rob Paulsen) and Clank (Jeff Bennett) show her around Pixie Hollow, teach her their craft and show her her house.

While out working, the trio are hit by sprinting thistles, a type of menacing weed. Tinker Bell meets Silvermist (Lucy Liu), a water fairy; Rosetta (Kristin Chenoweth), a garden fairy; Iridessa (Raven-Symoné), a light fairy; and Fawn (America Ferrera), an animal fairy. They tell her about the fairies who visit the mainland to bring each season. Tinker Bell is thrilled and cannot wait to go to the mainland for spring. After meeting them, she notices Vidia (Pamela Adlon), a fast-flying fairy who immediately dislikes her because of her unusually strong talent. Vidia challenges her to prove she will be able to go to the mainland, and Tinker Bell creates several inventions but messes up with them while showing them to the Minister of Spring (Steve Valentine). Tinker Bell then learns from Queen Clarion that only nature-talent fairies visit the mainland. She talks with Fairy Mary (Jane Horrocks), the tinker fairy overseer, who tries to please her with who she is, but instead inspires her to "switch her talent".

She tries her hand at nature skills; making dewdrops with Silvermist, lighting fireflies with Iridessa, and trying with Fawn to teach baby birds to fly, but she fails miserably at all of these. Meanwhile, Bobble and Clank cover for Tinker Bell when questioned by Fairy Mary. When Tinker Bell returns, she tries to explain, but Mary simply responds that she knows, and expresses her disappointment with Tinker Bell's actions.

On the beach, Tinker Bell finds parts of a music box and figures out how to put them together. Iridessa, Fawn, Silvermist, and Rosetta witness her doing this, then tell her that she should be proud of her talent — if this is what she's good at, the mainland should not matter. But Tinker Bell still wants to go to the mainland. She asks Rosetta if she will still teach her to be a garden fairy, to which she doesn't respond any differently.

As a last resort, Tinker Bell asks Vidia to teach her how to be a fast-flying fairy, then explains that her friends gave up on her. Vidia craftily tells her that capturing the sprinting thistles would prove her worth as a garden fairy. However, once she sees Tinker Bell making progress, she lets the captured thistles loose, and in attempting to recapture them, they destroy all the preparations for spring. Tinker Bell decides to leave, but after talking with Terence (Jesse McCartney), a dust-keeper fairy, about how important his job is, she realizes the importance of a tinker.

Tinker Bell redeems herself by inventing machines that quicken the process of decorating flowers, ladybugs, etc. This allows the other fairies to get back on schedule, thus saving the arrival of spring. Vidia is punished for prompting her to cause the chaos, and Queen Clarion allows Tinker Bell to join the nature-talent fairies when they bring spring to the mainland, which she declines having realised her talent. However, Fairy Mary arrives with the music box Tinker Bell fixed and gives her the task of delivering it to its original owner, who is shown to be Wendy Darling. The narrator ends by saying that when lost toys are found or a broken clock starts to work, "it all means that one very special fairy might be near."

Cast
 Mae Whitman as Tinker Bell, a tinker fairy born of a baby's first laugh. She is fascinated by stories about the mainland and is thus discouraged to learn that tinkers do not go there. She tries to learn various other skills before finally accepting, with the help of her friends, that she truly is a tinker. She helps to repair the massive damage she created and is rewarded, as she is allowed to join the nature fairies on their trip, where she delivers Wendy her lost toy.
 Kristin Chenoweth as Rosetta, a garden fairy who at first agrees to teach Tinker Bell how to garden, but later changes her mind after seeing Tinker Bell fix a music box.
 Raven-Symoné as Iridessa, a light fairy who tries to teach Tinker Bell to light fireflies. She is often the first to voice discomfort about Tinker Bell not wanting to accept her job as a tinker.
 Lucy Liu as Silvermist, a water fairy who tries to teach Tinker Bell to make dewdrops. She is possessed of a sassy sense of humor.
 America Ferrera as Fawn, an animal fairy who tries to teach Tinker Bell to get baby birds to fly. She is the closest to Tinker Bell and expresses her desire for her to be happy, which she suggests is in tinkering.
 Jane Horrocks as Fairy Mary, the overseer of the tinker fairies, who expresses high hope for Tinker Bell. She is greatly disappointed to learn that Tinker Bell does not like being a tinker, but is pleased to see her accept her job and help repair the damage caused to Spring. Mary charges her with delivering the toy she repaired after she becomes a nature fairy.
 Jesse McCartney as Terence, the pixie-dust keeper, who is surprised to find out that Tinker Bell knows his name. In mentioning how his job is unimportant, he causes Tinker Bell to remark just how important it is, and realize her own importance.
 Jeff Bennett as Clank, a large tinker fairy with a booming voice. He is usually found with Bobble or Tinker Bell.
 Rob Paulsen as Bobble, a wispy tinker fairy with large glasses who helps Tink out; he is usually found with Clank or with Cheese, a mouse.
 Pamela Adlon as Vidia, a fast-flying fairy, Tinker Bell's rival and the film's main antagonist. She is humiliated by Tinker Bell when they both choose the same hiding space from a hawk, and Vidia has a load of berries fall on her. When Tinker Bell comes to her for help, Vidia craftily suggests that Tink capture sprinting thistles. Vidia is later punished for her part in this.
 Anjelica Huston as Queen Clarion, the queen of all Pixie Hollow, who gives Tinker Bell her job and oversees the four seasons. Queen Clarion is wary of Tinker Bell's eagerness; she is proved correct when Tinker Bell accidentally destroys the preparations for spring after being sabotaged by Vidia. Queen Clarion nevertheless forgives Tinker Bell after Tinker Bell helps repair the damage done. Queen Clarion then rewards Tinker Bell by allowing her to go to the mainland.
 Loreena McKennitt as The Narrator, who relates the importance of fairies as it applies to reality.
 Steve Valentine as The Minister of Spring, the grand master of spring, who makes sure everything is finished in time.
 Kathy Najimy as The Minister of Summer
 Richard Portnow as The Minister of Autumn
 Gail Borges as The Minister of Winter
 America Young as Wendy Darling, the girl whose toy Tinker Bell repaired. She is given it back at the end of the film.
 Kat Cressida as Mrs. Darling
 Bob Bergen as Fireflies

Production
The film went through two dozen script versions and multiple directors. The movie was produced with animation firm Prana Studios from their India location in CGI.

Planned for release in fall 2007, the movie experienced delays in connection with personnel changes in Disney management. According to a June 2007 article in Variety, Sharon Morrill, the head of DisneyToons direct-to-DVD division since 1994, was removed from this position due to problems with the film, including a budget that had expanded to almost $50 million. Pixar Animation Studios executives John Lasseter and Ed Catmull were given leadership of Walt Disney Feature Animation after Disney purchased Pixar in early 2006, and although DisneyToons is not under their management, "they are said to have gotten increasingly involved in the unit's operations." Lasseter reportedly said that the film was at that time "virtually unwatchable" and that it would hurt both Walt Disney Feature Animation and the Disney Consumer Products line it was meant to support. Morill was moved to "special projects" and the status of the movie was seriously in doubt. Disney observer Jim Hill reported at the time that the complications surrounding this film had resulted in a decision that Disney would no longer produce straight-to-DVD sequels to its feature films.

Music
The score to the film was composed by Joel McNeely, who recorded the music with an 88-piece ensemble of the Hollywood Studio Symphony and Celtic violin soloist Máiréad Nesbitt at the Sony Scoring Stage.

Soundtrack
The movie's soundtrack was released on October 14, 2008, a week before the DVD release and contains songs from and inspired by the film. Other than the score suite, the only tracks in the film are both parts of "To the Fairies They Draw Near," "Fly to Your Heart" and "Fly With Me."

"To the Fairies They Draw Near" – Loreena McKennitt
"Fly to Your Heart" – Selena Gomez
"How to Believe" – Ruby Summer
"Let Your Heart Sing" – Katharine McPhee
"Be True" – Jonatha Brooke
"To the Fairies They Draw Near, Part II" – Loreena McKennitt
"Shine" – Tiffany Giardina
"Fly With Me" – Kari Kimmel
"Wonder of It All" – Scottie Haskell
"End Credit Score Suite" – Joel McNeely

Score
An album of Joel McNeely's score from the film was released on July 22, 2013, through Intrada Records as part of a co-branding arrangement with Walt Disney Records.

 Prologue
 To the Fairies They Draw Near – Loreena McKennitt
 A Child's Laughter / Flight to Pixie Hollow
 Choosing a Talent
 Tink Tours Pixie Hollow
 Welcome to Tinker's Nook
 Tinker Bell's New Home
 Tink Meets the Other Fairies
 The Lost Things Theme
 Tink Meets Vidia and Finds Lost Things
 Tinkering
 Your Place is Here
 Making Things
 Tink Tries to be a Light Fairy
 Teaching a Baby Bird to Fly
 Hawk!
 Tink Finds the Magic Box
 Searching for Answers
 Sprinting Thistles
 Tink Feels Lost
 Spring is Ruined
 Rebuilding Spring
 The Music Box Restored
 To the Fairies They Draw Near, Part II – Loreena McKennitt
 Tink Meets Wendy
 Fly to Your Heart – Selena Gomez

Marketing
The digitally animated character of Tinker Bell and other fairies appearing in the film were featured in Disney Channel bumpers in which they would draw the channel's logo with their wands. Rosetta's represents her webisode. Marketing efforts for the film included a tie-in with Southwest Airlines, decorating and naming a Boeing 737 "Tinker Bell One". Flight attendants wore fairy wings and awarded prizes to passengers who correctly answered trivia questions about the Tinker Bell character.

Frank Nissen, the director of Cinderella III: A Twist in Time directed a series of webisodes to promote the film on the "Fairies" channel of the Disney XD web site. Except for a few vocal effects, only one contains dialogue.

Video game

Disney Fairies: Tinker Bell is an adventure game for the Nintendo DS. The game begins with Tinker Bell's arrival in Pixie Hollow, preparing for each season. As the seasons progress, more areas of the game become accessible. After all four seasons are completed, every area may be visited and season preparations become optional and vary each time. Various different tasks must be accomplished, which are bestowed upon the player by other characters. Such tasks include deliveries, item repairs, requests for items and searching for insects.

The player plays as Tinker Bell in a free-roaming Pixie Hollow, using the touch screen to maneuver the character, move to other maps and play various minigames. The player must, for example, touch an arrow on the screen to move to another map or characters to speak to them. The touch screen is used in the item repair minigames as well. For example, the player must trace the pattern of a groove to clear it or rub the item to clean stains. The DS microphone is used to create wind to loosen leaves and petals or blow dust from an item being repaired. The highest rank on 'Tinker bell' is Champion of the Craft.

Different gameplay mechanics can also be acquired in-game, which require specific use of the touch screen. These include:

the ability to glow by holding the stylus directly above Tinker Bell. This can be used to reveal hidden items.
drawing a circle on-screen to perform a somersault. Used to collect falling items.
drawing a triangular shape on-screen to awaken plants throughout the game.
petting or tickling insects. Used to collect lost insects and awaken sleeping insects. Can also be used on random insects that roam about the maps. Items will be awarded.

Also present in the game is a "Friendship Meter", which serves as an indicator to measure the player's relationship with other characters. It can be filled by presenting the respective character with their favorite item, accomplishing tasks or even simply speaking to them. The meter can also be depleted, however, by not speaking to the character for extended periods of time, giving an unwanted gift or missing a repair deadline.

Features:
Create unique dresses, outfits and accessories
Mini-games, such as catching dew drops, painting ladybugs and collecting threads from sleeping silkworms
Multiplayer modes
Includes DGamer. Create unique 3-D avatars, create a persistent profile, chat with friends in a Disney Fairies chat room, earn in-game honors, Disney Fairies-themed accessories and unlock exclusive Disney and ESPN content, including streaming audio from Radio Disney and live coverage of the NBA on ESPN Radio.

Reception
The film saw a brief theatrical release at the El Capitan Theatre between September 19 and October 2. It was shown on Disney Channel on November 30 as part of "New in November".

, the film holds a 90% approval rating Rotten Tomatoes, based on ten reviews with an average rating of 6.53 out of 10. The film was released on DVD and Blu-ray Disc on October 28, 2008. In North America, 668,000 copies were sold on its first day of release, about 22 percent above previous estimations.

DVD sales brought in $52,201,882 in revenue for 3,347,686 units sold.

Sequels

Five sequels have been released: Tinker Bell and the Lost Treasure (2009), Tinker Bell and the Great Fairy Rescue (2010), Pixie Hollow Games (2011), Secret of the Wings (2012), and The Pirate Fairy (2014). One additional film Tinker Bell and the Legend of the NeverBeast, was released in Spring 2015.

References

External links

 
 
 
 
 Scoring Session Photo Gallery at ScoringSessions.com

2008 direct-to-video films
2008 films
2000s English-language films
American animated fantasy films
2008 computer-animated films
Disney direct-to-video animated films
DisneyToon Studios animated films
Tinker Bell (film series)
Films scored by Joel McNeely
2000s children's animated films
2000s children's fantasy films
2000s American films